Fat Pop (Volume 1) is the sixteenth studio album by English singer-songwriter Paul Weller. It was released on 14 May 2021 through Polydor Records and Solid Bond, in both a standard and deluxe edition. It was supported by the single "Shades of Blue".

Critical reception
On Metacritic, the album has a score of 82 out of 100 from 10 critical reviews, indicating "universal acclaim".

Commercial performance
Fat Pop (Volume 1) debuted at number one on the UK Albums Chart dated 21 May 2021 with over 26,000 chart sales, becoming Weller's sixth UK number-one album.

Track listing

Notes
  indicates an additional producer

Personnel
Musicians

 Paul Weller – vocals (all tracks), acoustic guitar (1–4, 6, 7, 9–12, 23–28), background vocals (1–12, 23, 25, 27), drums (1, 28), electric guitar (1, 3–5, 8–10, 27, 28), percussion (1, 4, 6–8, 10, 23, 25), piano (1–4, 6–8, 10–12, 23, 26, 28), Mellotron (2, 5, 8, 23, 25, 27, 28), bass (3, 8, 10, 27), Hammond organ (3, 6–8, 10, 11), clapping (6, 10), Rhodes (10, 28), harp (11, 27), guitar (13–22), Wurlitzer electric piano (27, 28), synthesizer (28)
 Charles Rees – drum programming (1), synthesizer (1, 3, 28), Moog bass (5), synth bass (5), Hammond organ (25), Mellotron (25, 28); percussion, sound effects (28)
 Steve Cradock – electric guitar (1, 7–9, 11, 23, 25, 28); harp, percussion, timpani, tubular bells (4, 10, 12); acoustic guitar (6, 25, 26), bass (10, 12), string arrangement (12), guitar (13–22), lap steel guitar (23), slide guitar (25)
 Andy Crofts – background vocals (2, 4, 6–12, 25), bass (2, 6–11, 13–15, 25), electric guitar, keyboards, melodica, timpani (4); clapping (6), synthesizer (9), acoustic bass guitar (11); guitar, organ, zither (23)
 Paul Speare – baritone saxophone (2, 10, 12, 28)
 Ben Gordelier – drums (2–5, 7–12, 23, 25, 27, 28), percussion (3–5, 7, 8, 10–12, 23, 25, 28), clapping (10)
 Steve Trigg – horn arrangement (2, 5, 7, 10, 12, 28), trumpet (2, 5, 10, 12, 28)
 Anthony Gaylard – tenor saxophone (2, 10, 12, 28)
 Dave Boraston – trumpet (2, 5, 10, 12, 28)
 Lia Metcalfe – vocals (2)
 Tom Heel – background vocals (3, 4, 7, 8, 10–23, 25, 27), Moog bass (3)
 Jan Kybert – Hammond organ (3), programming (3, 8), synthesizer (3, 28), percussion (6); Mellotron, sound effects (28)
 Leah Weller – background vocals (4)
 Tom Doyle – drum programming, keyboards, Wurlitzer electric piano (5)
 Anthony Brown – electric guitar (5)
 Paraorchestra – orchestra (5, 8, 12)
 Paul Wright – sarangi (5)
 Hannah Peel – string arrangement (5, 6, 8, 12, 23, 24, 28)
 White Label – string arrangement (5)
 Steve Pilgrim – background vocals (6, 7, 10–12), drums (6, 13–22, 28); clapping, conga (10); acoustic guitar (11, 28); electric guitar, piano (11)
 Katy Cox – cello (6, 24, 28)
 Stella Page – viola (6, 24, 28)
 Antonia Pagulatos – violin (6, 24, 28)
 Kotono Sato – violin (6, 24, 28)
 Andy Fairweather Low – vocals, background vocals (7)
 Jacko Peake – flute (7, 12–15); soprano saxophone, tenor saxophone (7)
 Steve Brookes – slide guitar (9)
 Phil Veacock – saxophone (11)

Technical
 Matt Colton – mastering
 Jan Kybert – mixing (1–12, 23–28)
 Charles Rees – mixing (13–22), engineering (1–22), editing (1–12, 23–28)
 Fiona Cruickshank – engineering (5, 8, 12)

Charts

References

2021 albums
Paul Weller albums
Polydor Records albums